Paul Robert Marcel Fauchet (27 June 1881 – 12 November 1937) was a French composer and organist.

Life 
Born in Paris, the son of the organist of the same name, he studied at the Conservatoire de Paris with Alexandre Guilmant and Paul Vidal and won first prizes in counterpoint and fugue, piano accompaniment and harmony. He worked as a coach in the class of Louis Vierne, who dedicated the song from the Vingt-quatre pièces en style libre to him and was organist at the Église Saint-Pierre-de-Chaillot. From 1927, he taught harmony at the Conservatoire. Among his students were Jacques de La Presle, Georges Taconet and Lucien Caillet

Fauchet composed a symphonic piece for organ and orchestra, a solennelle mass for four-part choir and orchestra, a mass for three-part choir and string quartet, Ecce sacerdos magnus for soloists, choir and orchestra, motets and other choral works as well as songs. His symphony for Concert band is still in the repertoire of wind orchestras today.

Paul Fauchet died in Paris on 12 November 1937 at the age of 56.

Works

Work for orchestra 
 Pièce symphoníque, for organ and orchestra

Works for harmony orchestra 
 1926 Symphonie en si bemol pour orchestre d'harmonie
 Ouverture: Maestoso - Allegro Deciso
 Nocturne: Lento
 Scherzo: Vivo, Giocoso, Molto Leggiero
 Finale: Allegro Vivace

Masses and other church music 
 Ecce Sacerdos Magnus, for soloists, mixed choir and orchestra 
 Messe solennelle, for mixed choir and orchestra
 Messe, for three-voice mixed choir and string quartet

Chamber music 
 Larghetto, for cello and organ

Works for organ 
 Quatre esquisses
 Cantilène en sol majeur
 Eglogue en sol majeur
 Méditation en sol majeur
 Scherzetto en sol mineur
 Choral en si mineur (1914)

Publications 
 Cinquante leçons d'harmonie, Paris: Éditions E. Gaudet
 Quarante leçons d'harmonie, 2 vols, Paris: Éditions Salabert and Éditions E. Gaudet,

Bibliography 
 Constant Pierre: Le Conservatoire national de musique et de déclamation. Imprimerie nationale, Paris, 1900.
 Paul E. Bierley, William H. Rehrig: The heritage encyclopedia of band music: composers and their music. Integrity Press, Westerville, Ohio, 1991, 
 Wolfgang Suppan, Armin Suppan: Das Neue Lexikon des Blasmusikwesens. Blasmusikverlag Schulz, Freiburg-Tiengen, 4th impression, 1994, 
 Rollin Smith: Louis Vierne: organist of Notre-Dame Cathedral, Pendragon Press, 1999. 805 p., 
 Francis Pieters: Les symphonies pour orchestre d'harmonie de Paul Fauchet et James Robert Gillette. In: CMF Journal Nº-530, June 2007.
 Shannon Kitelinger: Paul Fauchet’s Symphony in B-flat. Dissertation, University of North Texas, [ ? ].

References

External links 
 
 Paul Fauchet - Symphony in B-flat on YouTube

20th-century French composers
French composers of sacred music
French classical organists
French male organists
Musicians from Paris
1881 births
1937 deaths
20th-century organists
20th-century French male musicians
Male classical organists